Katrín Axelsdóttir (13 April 1956 – 25 June 1994) was an Icelandic multi-sport athlete, playing basketball, football and handball for Knattspyrnufélag Reykjavíkur and Glímufélagið Ármann. She was a member of both the Icelandic national basketball team and the Icelandic national handball team. In 1973, she won the Icelandic football championship with Ármann.

Personal life
In 1976, Katrín married Kári Marísson. She had four children who all played basketball, Kristín Björk Jónsdóttir, Arnar Snær Kárason, María Káradóttir and Axel Kárason.

References

1956 births
1994 deaths
Katrin Axelsdottir
Katrin Axelsdottir
Katrin Axelsdottir
Katrin Axelsdottir
Katrin Axelsdottir
Katrin Axelsdottir
Women's association footballers not categorized by position